Assessor macneilli, the blue devilfish or blue scissortail, is a fish from the southwest Pacific Ocean. It occasionally makes its way into the aquarium trade. It is purple-blue with long fins.

Description
Assessor macneilli is a dark blue fish which has a thin paler blue edge on the dorsal, anal, and pelvic fins. The dorsal fin has 11 spines and 8-10 rays, the anal fin has 3 spines and 9-10 rays and the pectoral fins have 14-16 rays.

Distribution
The blue devilfish is found in the western Pacific Ocean from north eastern Australia and New Guinea, through the Great Barrier Reef and the Coral Sea to New Caledonia.

Habitat and biology
It is a plankton feeder and its main food are crustaceans such as copepods, ostracods and amphipods. It is a mouthbrooder and the male guards the eggs in his mouth for 15–16 days, as hatching approaches the male keeps his mouth open continually and shifts the eggs backwards and forwards every 2–8 minutes.

Naming
Assessor macneilli was described in 1935 by G.P. Whitley from specimens collected at Hayman Island in the Whitsunday Passage off Queensland. Whitley did not set out why he chose the name but it is thought that the genus name Assessor means assistant or helper and that the specific name refers to Whitley's colleague, the carcinologist Francis A. McNeill of the Australian Museum. McNeill probably assisted Whitley in his ichthyological collections.

References

macneilli
Fish described in 1935